Charis Fourkiotis (born 4 March 2001) is a Greek professional footballer who plays as a centre-back.

References

2001 births
Living people
Greek footballers
Super League Greece players
Athlitiki Enosi Larissa F.C. players
Association football defenders
21st-century Greek people